Marine Terrace MRT station is a future underground Mass Rapid Transit station on the Thomson–East Coast line at the boundary of Marine Parade and Bedok planning areas, Singapore. Nearby residential areas such as Marine Terrace and Telok Kurau will be served.

The station took its name from Marine Terrace, a road as well as the residential estate within the proximity.

History
On 15 August 2014, the Land Transport Authority (LTA) announced that Marine Terrace station would be part of the proposed Thomson–East Coast line (TEL). The station will be constructed as part of Phase 4, consisting of 8 stations between Founders' Memorial and Bayshore. This segment was expected to be completed in 2023.

Construction started in 2016, with expected completion in 2024. Initially expected to open in 2023, the restrictions on the construction due to the COVID-19 pandemic has led to delays in the TEL line completion, and the date was pushed to 2024.

Details
Marine Terrace station will serve the TEL and will be between the Marine Parade and Siglap stations. The official station code will be TE27. Located along Marine Parade Road, the six entrances of the station will serve the residential area of Marine Terrace and nearby schools such as St. Patrick's School and CHIJ Katong Convent.

References

External links

Proposed railway stations in Singapore
Mass Rapid Transit (Singapore) stations
Railway stations scheduled to open in 2024